The Secret of One Hour (German:Das Geheimnis einer Stunde) is a 1926 German silent crime film directed by Max Obal and starring Ernst Reicher, Helena Makowska and Hilde Horst. It is part of the series of films portraying the detective character Stuart Webbs.

It was shot at the Emelka Studios in Munich.

Cast
 Ernst Reicher as Stuart Webbs  
 Helena Makowska as Geraldine Kreagh  
 Hilde Horst as Ethel - Geraldines Schwester  
 Hermann Nesselträger as Winston Horward 
 Gustav Ingo-Schröter 
 Otto Kronburger 
 Hermann Pfanz as Polizeikommisar  
 Ferdinand Martini as John  
 Klara Ney 
 Manfred Koempel-Pilot

References

Bibliography
 Rainey, Buck. Serials and Series: A World Filmography, 1912-1956. McFarland, 2015.

External links

1926 films
Films of the Weimar Republic
Films directed by Max Obal
German silent feature films
1926 crime films
German black-and-white films
German crime films
Films shot at Bavaria Studios
Bavaria Film films
1920s German films